Czechowo may refer to:

Czechowo, Greater Poland Voivodeship, Poland
Czechowo, Warmian-Masurian Voivodeship, Poland